MV Straitsman may refer to:
MV Straitsman (1972), a livestock carrier.
MV Straitsman (2005), a passenger and vehicle ferry.